Trennon Paynter (born 6 January 1970) is an Australian freestyle skier. He competed in the men's moguls event at the 2002 Winter Olympics.

References

1970 births
Living people
Australian male freestyle skiers
Olympic freestyle skiers of Australia
Freestyle skiers at the 2002 Winter Olympics
Skiers from Sydney